Richard G. Klein (born April 11, 1941) is a Professor of Biology and Anthropology at Stanford University. He is the Anne T. and Robert M. Bass Professor in the School of Humanities and Sciences. He earned his PhD at the University of Chicago in 1966, and was elected to the National Academy of Sciences in April 2003. His research interests include paleoanthropology, Africa and Europe. His primary thesis is that modern humans evolved in East Africa, perhaps 100,000 years ago and, starting 50,000 years ago, began spreading throughout the non-African world, replacing archaic human populations over time. He is a critic of the idea that behavioral modernity arose gradually over the course of tens of thousands, hundreds of thousands of years or millions of years, instead supporting the view that modern behavior arose suddenly in the transition from the Middle Stone Age to the Later Stone Age around 50-40,000 years ago.

Early life and education 
Klein was born in 1941 in Chicago, and went to college at the University of Michigan, Ann Arbor. In 1962, he enrolled as a graduate student at the University of Chicago to study with the Neanderthal expert, Francis Clark Howell. Of the two theories in vogue then, that Neanderthals had evolved into the Cro-Magnons of Europe or that they had been replaced by the Cro-Magnons, Klein favored the replacement theory. Klein completed a master's degree in 1964, and then studied at the University of Bordeaux with François Bordes, who specialized in prehistory. There he visited the La Quina and La Ferrassie caves in southwest France, containing Cro-Magnon artifacts layered on top of Neanderthal ones. These visits influenced him into believing the shift from Neanderthal to modern humans 40,000 to 35,000 years ago was sudden rather than gradual. Klein also visited Russia to examine artifacts.

Klein briefly held positions at the University of Wisconsin–Milwaukee, Northwestern University in Evanston, Illinois, and the University of Washington, Seattle, before becoming a professor at the University of Chicago in 1973. Twenty years later, he moved to Stanford University.

Scientific contributions

Works
Man and culture in the late Pleistocene: A case study, Chandler Publishing, 1969. ASIN: B0006BYMZM (republished by ACLS Humanities as ebook with )
Ice-Age Hunters of the Ukraine, University of Chicago Press, 1973. 
The Analysis of Animal Bones from Archaeological Sites, with Kathryn Cruz-Uribe, University of Chicago Press, 1984. 
Quaternary extinctions: A prehistoric revolution, first editor Paul S. Martin, University of Arizona Press, 1989. 
The Dawn of Human Culture, with Blake Edgar, John Wiley & Sons, 2002. 
The Human Career: Human Biological and Cultural Origins, 3rd ed., University of Chicago Press, 2009.

Awards
 Member of the National Academy of Sciences
 Member of the American Academy of Arts and Sciences
 President, South African Archaeological Society (2002–2004)
 Gordon J. Laing Award

See also
Behavioral modernity

References

External links
three distinct populations(archived)
Archeology and the Evolution of Human Behavior
The Ysterfontein 1 Middle Stone Age site, South Africa, and early human exploitation of coastal resources

1941 births
Members of the United States National Academy of Sciences
Living people
American paleoanthropologists
Stanford University Department of Biology faculty
Stanford University Department of Anthropology faculty
University of Wisconsin–Milwaukee faculty
Recent African origin of modern humans
University of Chicago alumni
University of Michigan alumni
University of Chicago faculty
Scientists from Chicago
21st-century American biologists
American anthropologists
Jewish anthropologists